Erik Van Norman Goeddel (born December 20, 1988) is an American former professional baseball pitcher.  He played in Major League Baseball (MLB) for the New York Mets, Seattle Mariners and Los Angeles Dodgers.

Career

Amateur career
Goeddel attended Bellarmine College Prep in San Jose, California, where Baseball America and Perfect Game USA ranked him the third-best high school baseball prospect in the United States and Canada. After going undrafted in the 2007 Major League Baseball draft, Goeddel enrolled at the University of California, Los Angeles (UCLA), where he played college baseball for the UCLA Bruins. In 2009, he played collegiate summer baseball with the Brewster Whitecaps of the Cape Cod Baseball League.

New York Mets

The New York Mets selected Goeddel in the 24th round of the 2010 MLB Draft. The Mets added Goeddel to their 40-man roster after the 2013 season. Goeddel played in the minors with the Gulf Coast League Mets, Savannah Sand Gnats, St. Lucie Mets, Binghamton Mets, and the Las Vegas 51s.

Goeddel was called up to the majors on September 1, 2014, and made his major league debut the same day, pitching in relief against the Miami Marlins in a 6-9 loss. Goeddel replaced Jeurys Familia with two on and one out in the eighth, and walked in the third run of the inning. Goeddel finished the season with a 2.70 ERA appearing in 6 games with 6.2 innings pitched getting 6 strikeouts with a WHIP of 1.05 while giving up 3 hits, 2 runs and 4 walks.

Goeddel was called up on April 7, 2015 with then-closer Jenrry Mejía going on the disabled list on April 5. On June 12, Goeddel was placed on the disabled list with a right elbow strain. His spot on the roster was replaced by Danny Muno. He spent the majority of the season since the injury rehabbing with the Binghamton Mets. He was promoted back again on September 1 due to expanded rosters.

When the Mets reached the playoffs, Goeddel was placed on the roster for the NLDS making one appearance in game three in the top of the ninth inning giving up three runs in a 13-7 win for the Mets. While giving up the runs, he gave 4 hits, 1 home run while facing 4 batters. However, he was replaced by Sean Gilmartin to be on the roster for the NLCS. It was the only change made to the roster from the NLDS. Goeddel finished the season with 1-1 record, 2.43 ERA, and 34 strikeouts in 35 games with 33 innings pitched.

Texas Rangers
On December 19, 2017, Goeddel signed a minor league deal with the Texas Rangers. He was released on March 19, 2018,

Seattle Mariners
On March 20, 2018, he signed a minor league contract with the Seattle Mariners the following day. He was designated for assignment on May 16, 2018.

Los Angeles Dodgers
On May 18, 2018, he was claimed off waivers by the Los Angeles Dodgers. He pitched in 26 games for the Dodgers, with a 3.38 ERA. He missed much of the season with an elbow injury that shut him down for good in August. Goeddel was designated for assignment on November 20, 2018 and released the following day.

Personal life
Goeddel's brother, Tyler, is also a professional baseball player. Their father, David Goeddel, is a pioneering biologist responsible for the development of both synthetic insulin and human growth hormone.

References

External links

1988 births
Living people
People from San Mateo, California
Baseball players from California
Major League Baseball pitchers
UCLA Bruins baseball players
Brewster Whitecaps players
New York Mets players
Seattle Mariners players
Los Angeles Dodgers players
Gulf Coast Mets players
Savannah Sand Gnats players
St. Lucie Mets players
Binghamton Mets players
Las Vegas 51s players
Tacoma Rainiers players
Bellarmine College Preparatory alumni
USC Viterbi School of Engineering alumni